Anu Elizabeth Jose is an Indian lyricist. She made her debut in the 2012 Malayalam film Thattathin Marayathu through the song "Muthuchippi Poloru".

Early life

In 2015 she wrote lyrics for the film 32aam Adhyayam 23aam Vaakyam, music composed by Bijibal.

Awards and nominations

Selected filmography

References

External links
Interview with Malayalam Film Lyricist Anu Elizabeth
A chat with Anu Elizabeth Jose
Techies movie lyrics
A voice for Love Anu elizabeth jose
Sunrisers Hyderabad Malayalam Theme song
Interview with Anu Elizabeth Sunrisers Hyderabad Malayalam Theme
Aswamedham
Chandralekha Interview on Reporter tv
Bidding adieu with Aanandam
A Woman Lyricist in a man's world

Living people
Malayalam-language lyricists
Malayalam-language writers
People from Alappuzha district
Film musicians from Kerala
Indian women composers
21st-century Indian women writers
21st-century Indian dramatists and playwrights
Screenwriters from Kerala
21st-century Indian composers
Women writers from Kerala
Year of birth missing (living people)
Women musicians from Kerala
21st-century Indian women musicians
Musicians from Alappuzha
Writers from Alappuzha
21st-century Indian screenwriters
21st-century women composers